William Necton (fl. 1584–1597), of London, was an English politician.

He was a Member (MP) of the Parliament of England for New Shoreham in 1584, 1586, 1589, 1593 and 1597.

References

Year of birth missing
Year of death missing
Politicians from London
English MPs 1584–1585
English MPs 1586–1587
English MPs 1589
English MPs 1593
English MPs 1597–1598
Members of the Parliament of England for New Shoreham